Mettala (மெட்டாலா)is a village, Mettala is a village in Namakiripeta Union in Namakkal District of Tamil Nadu state in India.

location
The village is  under the Karkudalpatti Panchayat, which is a part of the Namagiripet union.

Adjacent communities 
It is located on the border of Namakkal district and Salem district. It is surrounded by Dhammampatti Panchayat and Rasipuram Panchayat Union on the east and Vazhlapady and Bethanyakanpalim Panchayat Union on the north.

References

Villages in Namakkal district